Princeton (originally Vermilion Forks) is a town in the Similkameen region of southern British Columbia, Canada. It lies just east of the Cascade Mountains, which continue south into Washington, Oregon and California. The Tulameen and Similkameen Rivers converge here. At the 2016 census, the population was 2,828.

Princeton centres on seven blocks of businesses along Bridge Street and five blocks on Vermilion Avenue; there are also businesses along British Columbia Highway 3.

Historically, the area's main industry has been mining—copper, gold, coal, and some platinum—The town's biggest employers are Copper Mountain Mine and a sawmill owned by Weyerhaeuser, along with a few smaller timber companies, such as Princeton Wood Preservers and Princeton Post and Rail.

History

Before European contact, the land around today's Princeton was known among First Nations people as a source of red ochre. Beginning no later than 1846, fur traders, settlers, and miners established trails connecting what was then known as Vermilion Forks to the Pacific Coast of British Columbia. John Fall Allison became, in 1858, the first permanent settler of European ancestry. To this day, the site of his home functions locally as a kilometre zero, with creeks east of Princeton having names like "Five Mile" based on their distance from that location. The town he founded was renamed "Prince Town" (later corrupted to "Princeton") to honour an 1860 visit to eastern Canada by Prince Edward (later King Edward VII).

In the years 1909–1915 the railways arrived, with the Kettle Valley Railway (later Canadian Pacific) connecting Princeton to the Great Northern.

Until 1961, Princeton was home to a brewery, the Princeton Brewing Company. Until the 1940s, the brewery kept its beer cool in the Vermilion Cave. The cave, which held up to 20 railway cars at a time, was largely demolished to make way for the Hope-Princeton Highway, part of the Crowsnest Highway (British Columbia Highway 3).

Princeton joined the Canadian Board of Trade (later Chamber of Commerce) in 1913, and was incorporated as a village in 1951, and as a town in 1978. Beginning in the 1980s, Princeton began to revitalize its downtown, a plan that included red brick sidewalks and new streetlights. In the 1990s, they adopted a "heritage" theme, with many businesses converting their exteriors to match architectural styles from roughly a century earlier. Further landscaping of the town centre continues as of 2008.

The historic Princeton Hotel on Bridge Street, which had been in operation since 1912, burned to the ground on April 8, 2006.

The name Vermilion Forks survives in the name of Vermilion Forks Indian Reserve No. 1, which is immediately adjacent to the town of Princeton to the east, and is one of the reserves of the Upper Similkameen Indian Band, whose head offices are in Hedley.

Demographics 

Religion 
According to the 2021 census, religious groups in Princeton included:
Irreligion (1,785 persons or 63.6%)
Christianity (940 persons or 33.5%)
Sikhism (30 persons or 1.1%)
Other (25 persons or 0.9%)

Transportation 

Princeton was formerly served by the Great Northern Railway and the Kettle Valley railway, neither of which still have tracks within the Similkameen Valley. Today Princeton is accessible exclusively by road and air. On land, it is located at the junction of two highways and two major regional roads: Highway 5A to Merritt, Highway 3 to Hope and Osoyoos, as well as Coalmont Road to Coalmont and Tulameen, and the Princeton-Summerland Road.

Public transportation is provided by the South Okanagan-Similkameen Transit System based out of Penticton, with three buses weekly along the Coalmont-Penticton Corridor, with connections to scheduled BC Transit services in Penticton to Kelowna and other communities. A BC Transit Health Connections service is also available. Until June 1, 2018, Greyhound Canada operated buses along the Hope-Princeton highway to Penticton and further to the Alberta border.

Princeton has one airport, the Princeton Aerodrome. The airport is not serviced by any scheduled carriers and has extremely limited facilities. It was formerly home to an Air Cadets gliding program. The nearest airport with regional scheduled passenger services is Penticton Regional Airport, and the nearest airport with scheduled passenger service to both regional and international destinations is Kelowna International Airport.

Princeton Museum

The Princeton and District Museum and Archives houses the Joe Pollard fossil collection, an early 1900s stagecoach, a 1934 fire engine, local First Nations artifacts, a collection of local newspapers, a collection of local butterflies, exhibits about pioneer life, a livery stable, and an old firehouse.

John Fall Allison and Susan Louisa Moir Allison 

After their marriage in 1868, John and Susan Louisa Moir Allison moved to the Similkameen Valley, becoming the first non-Aboriginal settlers to live there. The couple, aided by Mr Allison's knowledge of Chinook Jargon, a trade language, became close with nearby Aboriginal populations. There, the two produced 14 children. In the Valley, Mrs. Allison had what she described as her happiest days, traversing nearby mountains on horseback and establishing relationships with nearby First Nations. She claimed to have sighted Ogopogo, a cryptid lake monster similar to the Loch Ness Monster in Okanagan Lake.

In 1876, Mr. Allison was appointed a Justice of the Peace and became the first Gold Commissioner of the newly created Similkameen Mining District. In 1891, an ethnographic paper written by Mrs Allison on the Similkameen was published by the British Association for the Advancement of Science, and another was published in the Journal of the Royal Anthropological Institute of Great Britain and Ireland. In 1900 she published a poem about an Aboriginal chief.

Mr Allison died in 1897 and was buried at a site overlooking the Similkameen River near a landmark named "Castle Rock". Mrs Allison moved to Vancouver in 1928 where she died on February 1, 1937, aged 92. In 2010 the Government of Canada designated Susan Louisa Moir Allison as a person of national historic significance.

Climate
Princeton has a cold semi-arid climate (Köppen BSk). It is located just east of the Cascade mountains, giving the town a rain shadow effect whereby the community receives very little precipitation relative to areas on the windward side of the Cascade mountains. Princeton is one of the sunniest places in British Columbia with 2088 hours of sunshine annually. The 323 days per year with measurable sunshine, defined by having a minimum of 6 minutes of sunshine in a day, is the most in the province, and one of the highest in Canada. The 29.4 days with measurable sunshine in March is the highest in the country.

Princeton Castle

On the eastern outskirts of Princeton are the ruins of East Princeton. Conceived in 1910 as a "Great Cement City", the area is now a resort known as "Princeton Castle".

Four years, a million dollars, hundreds of thousands of hours of work by engineers, carpenters, and masons (several of whom died in accidents) went into constructing a cement plant. The project came to an abrupt halt in 1914, for reasons not entirely clear: possibly lack of limestone or (due to World War I) coal.

Education and health 
Princeton is part of School District #58, and has two elementary schools (John Allison for grades K-3 and Vermilion Forks for grades 4-7), a secondary school (for grades 8-12) and The Bridge, a continuing education school (grades 8-12 and adult learners that have not completed high school).

Princeton has a hospital and long-term care center (Princeton General Hospital and Ridgewood Lodge), two Seniors' Clubs and several seniors' and handicapped housing facilities, and a variety of drug and alcohol counseling services, an adult mental care drop-in center, a program for women in abusive relationships, and numerous other social service institutions.

Princeton on film

In 1987, Burt Reynolds starred in the film Malone, which was filmed mainly in neighbouring Hedley, British Columbia, but included key scenes in downtown Princeton and the surrounding area.  Also partly shot in the area was Sean Penn's 2001 film The Pledge, starring Jack Nicholson, which was also filmed in Lytton and Lillooet.

Recreation
Recreational opportunities exist year round in Princeton and the surrounding area including: biking, skiing, fishing, camping, hunting and hiking. The Kettle Valley Railway, a popular trail for cyclists passes through the town. The China Ridge Ski area on Bear Mountain offers classic cross country ski trails for all skill levels and are well maintained. Manning Park is a nearby provincial park with both summer and winter recreation options, including the Gibson Pass Ski Area.

References

External links 

Towns in British Columbia
Populated places in the Similkameen